"The Lost Art of Keeping a Secret" is the first single from Queens of the Stone Age's second album, Rated R. It was released in the summer of 2000 through Interscope Records in Europe as a standard single, and in the United States as only a promotional one. The track's music video received mild airplay on music television. It was also the only single from Rated R to get a chart position, reaching number 21 on the Mainstream Rock charts, number 36 on the Modern Rock charts and number 31 on the UK Singles Chart.

The song was featured in the films Sound City and Smokin' Aces 2: Assassins' Ball, the TV series Numbers, Nip/Tuck, Entourage and Daria, and in the video games Tony Hawk: Ride, Driver: San Francisco and Gran Turismo 5.

Track listings
All tracks by Joshua Homme and Nick Oliveri, except where noted.

Europe

7" 497 387-7
CD 497 410-2
"The Lost Art of Keeping a Secret" - 3:36
"Ode to Clarissa" - 2:40

UK

CD 1 497 391-2
"The Lost Art of Keeping a Secret" - 3:36
"Born to Hula" (Homme) - 5:52
 A re-record of the song previously released on the Gamma Ray EP and the Kyuss / Queens of the Stone Age split EP.
"The Lost Art of Keeping a Secret" (CD-ROM Video) - 3:36

CD 2 497 392-2
"The Lost Art of Keeping a Secret" - 3:36
"Ode to Clarissa" - 2:40
"Monsters in the Parasol" (Live in Seattle) (Homme, Mario Lalli) - 3:32

Personnel
 Joshua Homme – Lead vocals, rhythm & lead guitar
 Nick Oliveri – Bass, backing vocals
 Nick Lucero – Drums
 Pete Stahl – Backing vocals
 Dave Catching – Electric piano
 Barrett Martin – Vibes
 Scott Mayo – Baritone sax
 Chris Goss – Noise piano

Charts

References

External links

Queens of the Stone Age songs
2000 debut singles
Songs written by Josh Homme
Songs written by Nick Oliveri
2000 songs
Interscope Records singles